Orthocis zoufali is a species of tree-fungus beetle in Ciidae family which is endemic to Bosnia and Herzegovina.

References

Beetles described in 1884
Endemic fauna of Bosnia and Herzegovina
Ciidae